EFSA is an acronym for:

Egyptian Financial Supervisory Authority
European Food Safety Authority

EFSA is also the ICAO code for Savonlinna Airport.